Amadaiya Rennie (born 17 March 1990, in Monrovia, Liberia) is a Liberian football player, who plays as a forward.

Club career
Following good performances at Mighty Barrolle he was voted most valuable player of the 2007 season, and also became team captain of the Liberia under-20 national football team. This drew the interest from several clubs, such as A.C. Siena and Portland Timbers, however following a trial with Allsvenskan club IF Elfsborg, he decided to sign for the Swedish team. Spending the 2009 season in the U-21 team he was signed to a first-team contract prior to the 2010 season.

On 22 March 2011, he was loaned out to Allsvenskan rivals GAIS, following a severe injury to fellow Elfsborg player Mohammed Abdulrahman who was on loan to GAIS.

On 1 July he signed with the Swedish Superettan club Degerfors IF, a contract that was to expire at the end of the 2011 season. On 4 October 2011 he signed a new contract with Degerfors, keeping him at the club for two more years.

In November 2013 he signed a three-year-long contract with Hammarby IF, leaving Degerfors as a free agent.

In August 2015, Rennie completed a season-long loan deal with Norwegian side Brann, with striker Jakob Orlov moving the opposite way.

National team
Putting up a notable performance in Mighty Barrolle, Rennie was called up to the Liberia under-20 team, where he quickly became team captain. He was then in 2010 called up to the Liberia to participate in the 2012 Africa Cup of Nations qualification against Zimbabwe, he was however left out of the game as a reserve, he was then pulled up to the main squad against Mali, he started the match and was substituted off in the 82nd minute.

References

External links
 
 
 Amadaiya Rennie at Soccerway
 Amadaiya Rennie at KTFF

1990 births
Living people
Sportspeople from Monrovia
Liberian footballers
Liberian expatriate footballers
Association football forwards
Liberia international footballers
Liberian expatriate sportspeople in Sweden
Liberian expatriate sportspeople in Norway
Liberian expatriate sportspeople in Turkey
Liberian expatriate sportspeople in Egypt
Expatriate footballers in Sweden
Expatriate footballers in Norway
Expatriate footballers in Turkey
Expatriate footballers in Egypt
Expatriate footballers in Cyprus
IF Elfsborg players
GAIS players
Degerfors IF players
SK Brann players
Antalyaspor footballers
Hammarby Fotboll players
Haras El Hodoud SC players
Gönyeli S.K. players
Norwegian First Division players
Superettan players
Allsvenskan players
Süper Lig players
Egyptian Premier League players